Bankuba Forest Park is a forest park in the Gambia. Established on January 1, 1954, it covers 794.3 hectares.

It is located some 221 km east of Banjul, the state capital.

References
  

Protected areas established in 1954
Forest parks of the Gambia